Géza Varga (3 April 1946 – 28 March 2021) was a Hungarian politician who served as a MP.

References

1946 births
2021 deaths
Hungarian politicians
Jobbik politicians
Members of the National Assembly of Hungary (2010–2014)